A Pesticide detection kit is a kit that scientific test kit detects the presence of pesticide residues.  Various organizations create them, among them Defence Food Research Laboratory of India.

References

Pesticides
Chemical tests